is a Shinto shrine located in Moji-ku, Kitakyūshū, Fukuoka, Japan.

History
The wife of Emperor Chūai, Empress Jingū, came here sometime during the legendary military invasion of Korea in the 3rd century. She had Mekari Shrine built as a way of giving thanks to the Kami. The present main shrine was rebuilt in 1767 by the Ogasawara clan from Harima.

Mekari Shinji Shinto ritual
In the shrine's Shinto ritual called Mekari Shinji, wakame seaweed is cut from the ocean at low tide and offered to an altar in a ceremony conducted in the early morning hours of the first day of the New Year according to the old lunar calendar. The ritual is thought to bring about good luck and has been designated an Intangible Folk Cultural Asset by Fukuoka prefecture.

See also
List of Shinto shrines

Gallery

References

External links
Official website 
Crossroad Fukuoka - Fukuoka Prefecture Tourist Information 

Shinto shrines in Fukuoka Prefecture
Buildings and structures in Kitakyushu
Tourist attractions in Kitakyushu